Coco Gauff and Jessica Pegula defeated Veronika Kudermetova and Elise Mertens in the final, 3–6, 7–5, [10–5] to win the doubles tennis title at the 2022 Qatar Open.

Nicole Melichar-Martinez and Demi Schuurs were the defending champions, but did not compete together. Melichar-Martinez partnered Alexa Guarachi, but lost in the second round to Kirsten Flipkens and Alison Van Uytvanck. Schuurs partnered Chan Hao-ching, but lost in the first round to Natela Dzalamidze and Tereza Martincová.

Seeds
The top four seeds received a bye into the second round.

Draw

Finals

Top half

Bottom half

References

External links
Main draw

Qatar Doubles
2022 in Qatari sport